The current Editor-in-Chief at the Ottawa Citizen, Gerry Nott formerly held the same position at CanWest. In 2009, he and Scott Keir Anderson swapped positions.

He previously worked at the Hamilton Spectator, Windsor Star and Calgary Herald.

References

Canadian newspaper editors
Canadian male journalists
Living people
Year of birth missing (living people)